This is a list of women artists who were born in Brazil or whose artworks are closely associated with that country.

A
Zina Aita (1900–1967), Italian-Brazilian modernist painter
Georgina de Albuquerque (1885–1962), Impressionist painter
Mara Alvares (born 1948), contemporary artist
Marina Amaral (born 1994), known for colorization of historical photographs
Tarsila do Amaral (1886–1973), modernist painter
Abigail de Andrade (1864–1890), painter
Amanda Maciel Antunes (fl 2000s), costume designer
Camila Alves (born 1982), fashion designer
Maria Auxiliadora (1935–1974), painter

B
Brígida Baltar (c.1959–2022), visual artist
Ladjane Bandeira (1927–1999), painter, art director
Tatiana Blass (born 1979), contemporary artist
Vera Chaves Barcellos (born 1938), visual artist
Lia Menna Barreto (born 1959), painter
Lenora de Barros (born 1953), contemporary artist
Edith Behring (1916–1996), painter
Alice Brill (1920–2013), German-Brazilian painter and photographer
Elisa Bracher (born 1965), sculptor

C
Carlota De Camargo Nascimento (1904–1974), sculptor
Marina Camargo (born 1980), multimedia artist
Maria Cândido (born 1939), artist working with clay
Josely Carvalho (born 1942), multimedia artist
 Leda Catunda (born 1961), painter, engraver, educator
Catia Chien (fl 2007), illustrator
Sandra Cinto (born 1968), contemporary artist
Lygia Clark (1920–1988), painter, installation artist
Mariza Dias Costa (1952–2019), cartoonist
Tereza Costa Rêgo (1929–2020), painter

D
Liliane Dardot (born 1946), painter 
Djanira da Motta e Silva (1914–1979), painter, illustrator, engraver

E
Sonia Ebling (1918–2006), sculptor
Laura Erber (born 1979), video artist, writer

F
Bea Feitler (1938–1982), book cover and catalogue designer
Julieta de França (1870–1951), sculptor
Angela Freiberger (born 1953), sculptor, performance artist
Iole de Freitas (born 1945), sculptor, engraver, installation artist

G
Anna Bella Geiger (born 1933), multidisciplinary artist, educator
Olívia Guedes Penteado (1872–1934), art patron, activist
Sonia Gomes (born 1948), sculptor
Carmela Gross (born 1946), visual artist

H
Eli Heil (1929–2017), painter, sculptor, ceramist

J
Adriana Janacópulos (1897–c.1978), sculptor

K
Renina Katz (born 1925), printmaker, painter
Eleonore Koch (1926–2018), painter, sculptor

L
Felícia Leirner (1904–1996), sculptor
Sheila Leirner (born 1948), curator, art critic, activist
Juliana Cerqueira Leite (born 1981), sculptor
Ju Loyola (born 1979), cartoonist, illustrator
Renata Lucas (born 1971), painter
Mariannita Luzzati (born 1963), painter, engraver, video artist

M
Solange Magalhães (born 1939), French-born Brazilian painter
Anita Malfatti (1889–1964), modernist painter 
Cinthia Marcelle (born 1974), multimedia artist
Maria Martins (1894–1973), sculptor
Sylvia Martins (born 1956), painter
Lia Menna Barreto (born 1959), sculptor
Alessandra Meskita (fl 2007), fashion designer
Alice Miceli (born 1980), video artist
Beatriz Milhazes (born 1960), painter
Djanira da Motta e Silva (1914–1979), painter, illustrator, printmaker

N
Ananda Nahu (born 1985), street artist
Naza (born 1955), abstract painter
Constancia Nery (born 1936), naive art painter
Rivane Neuenschwander (born 1967), contemporary artist
Teresa Nicolao (born 1928), painter, set designer
Lucia Nogueira (1950–1998), painter

O
Tomie Ohtake (1913–2015), Japanese-Brazilian painter, sculptor, print maker
Christina Oiticica (born 1951), painter
Lydia Okumura (born 1948), abstract painter
Camila Oliveira Fairclough (born 1979), visual artist
Fayga Ostrower (1920–2001), Polish-born Brazilian engraver, painter, educator

P
Ana Maria Pacheco (born 1943), painter, sculptor, now in the UK
Lygia Pape (1927–2004), sculptor, engraver, filmmaker 
Letícia Parente (1930–1991), video artist
Regina Parra (born 1981), contemporary artist
Rosana Paulino (born 1967), visual artist, educator and curator 
Marianne Peretti (born 1927), French-Brazilian sculptor, muralist and stained glass artist
Wanda Pimentel (1943–2019), painter 
Luiza Prado (born 1988), multidisciplinary artist

Q
Anna Letycia Quadros (1929–2018), painter

R
Madalena dos Santos Reinbolt (1919–1977), painter, textile artist

S
Neide Sá (born 1940), painter
Gretta Sarfaty (fl 1970s), Greek-Brazilian painter and multimedia artist
Katie van Scherpenberg (born 1940), painter
Regina Silveira (born 1939), painter
Luzia Simons (born 1953), painter
Camila Soato (born 1985), oil painter 
Nathália Suellen (born 1989), digital artist

T
Amelia Toledo (1926–2017), sculptor, painter
Clarissa Tossin (born 1973), painter
Celeida Tostes (1929–1995), sculptor, ceramist
Iracema Trevisan (born 1982), fashion designer
Yara Tupynambá (born 1932), painter

V
Adriana Varejão (born 1964), painter, drawer, sculptor and installation artist
Cybèle Varela (born 1943), painter, video-artist, photographer
Nicolina Vaz de Assis (1874–1941), sculptor
Fernanda Viégas (born 1971), graphical designer
Mary Vieira (1927–2001), sculptor

W
Hilde Weber (1913–1994), cartoonist, illustrator
Bertha Worms (1868–1937), French-Brazilian painter

X
Márcia X (1959–2005), performance artist
Niobe Xandó (1915–2010), painter

Z
Carla Zaccagnini (born 1973), painter and curator

-
Brazilian women artists, List of
Women artists, List of Brazilian
Artists
Artists